Ansus is an Austronesian language spoken in Papua Province of Western New Guinea, Indonesia.

It is one of the South Halmahera–West New Guinea languages.

References

External links 

 Ansus Wordlist with English and Indonesian glossaries

South Halmahera–West New Guinea languages
Languages of western New Guinea
Papua (province) culture